X Factor is a Danish television music competition to find new singing talent. The fifth season premiered on January 1, 2012, on DR1 and ended on March 23, 2012, at Jyske Bank Boxen. Lise Rønne returned for her fourth season as host. Thomas Blachman, Pernille Rosendahl and Cutfather returned for their respective fourth, third and second seasons.

Judges and host
On September 12, 2011, it was announced that Thomas Blachman, Pernille Rosendahl and Cutfather would all be returning as judges for season 5, along with Lise Rønne as host.

Selection process

Auditions
Auditions took place in Copenhagen and Århus.

Superbootcamp
Cutfather was given the Over 25s category, Rosendahl was given the 15–24s and Blachman was given the Groups.

Bootcamp
Cutfather was assisted by Kato in choosing his final three in the Over 25s category for the live shows; Rosendahl was assisted by Mattias Kolstrup in choosing her final three in the 15–24s category; and Blachman was assisted in choosing his final three in the Groups category by Dicte.

The 6 eliminated acts were:
15–24s: Jonas, Kristel
Over 25s: Jason, Kristel
Groups: Double Trouble, Julie & Johnnie

Contestants
Key:
 – Winner
 – Runner-up
 – Withdrew

Live shows
The live shows started on February 10, 2012, at DR Byen. 
Colour key

Contestants' colour key:
{|
|-
| – Rosendahl's contestants (15–24s)
|-
| – Cutfather's contestants (Over 25s)
|-
| – Blachman's contestants (Groups)

|}

 In week 4, Blachman voted against his own act and Cutfather didn't have to vote, but he later said that he would have voted against Tandberg & Østenby.

Live show details

Week 1 (February 10)
Theme: Free choice

Judges' votes to eliminate
 Blachman: Katrine
 Cutfather: Phuong & Rasmus
 Rosendahl: Phuong & Rasmus

Week 2 (February 17)
Theme: Danish hits

Judges' votes to eliminate
 Cutfather: Katrine
 Rosendahl: Mulila
 Blachman: Katrine

Week 3 (February 24)
Theme: Dance hits

Judges' votes to eliminate
 Cutfather: Tandberg & Østenby
 Rosendahl: Mulila
 Blachman: Mulila

Week 4 (March 2)
Theme: Mash-ups

Judges' votes to eliminate
 Rosendahl: Tandberg & Østenby
 Blachman: Tandberg & Østenby
 Cutfather: didn't have to vote, but he later said that he would have voted against Tandberg & Østenby.

Week 5 (March 9)
Theme: Songs by Rasmus Seebach
Musical Guest: Lionel Richie & Rasmus Seebach ("Say You, Say Me")

There was no elimination this week due to Nicoline Simone & Jean Michel withdrawing for personal reasons. All votes from this week were moved forward to the next week.

Week 6: Semi-final (March 16)
 Theme: Unplugged songs; Rap songs (duet)
Musical Guests: Yepha ("Det går ned"), Kesi ("Ku Godt") & Clemens feat. Sarah West ("Ingen kender dagen")

The semi-final did not feature a final showdown and instead the act with the fewest public votes, Morten Benjamin, was automatically eliminated.

Week 7: Final (March 23)

References

Season 05
2012 Danish television seasons